Toolijooa is a small village in the Municipality of Kiama, Illawarra, New South Wales, Australia.

Transport
It lies on the South Coast railway line, and once had a railway station.

Duplication 
Duplication of the tracks through Toolijooa is proposed to increase capacity for freight trains and to allow passenger services to be improved from hourly to half-hourly.

Town
Toolijooa is one of the last villages in the Illawarra. It is located next to Gerroa and has many farms.

References

Municipality of Kiama
Towns in New South Wales